Rangaraj Subbiah (born 3 October 1954), professionally known as Sathyaraj, is an Indian actor, producer, director and a media personality who predominantly appears in Tamil and Telugu films.  His 240 films also include works in Malayalam, Kannada and Hindi.

He started his career in antagonistic roles and later played lead roles. He met with success through lead performances in Vedham Pudhithu (1987), Nadigan (1990), Amaidhi Padai (1994), Periyar (2007) and Onbadhu Roobai Nottu (2007). He also received acclaim for supporting roles in Nanban (2012), Mirchi (2013), Raja Rani (2013), Baahubali (2015), Baahubali 2 (2017) and Kanaa (2018). He was also the director of the film Villadhi Villain (1995), starring himself in three different roles.

In 2011, he had a brief career as a television host for the game show Home Sweet Home on STAR Vijay. He has also served as a brand ambassador for Pothys, Susi Emu farms, and Kumaran jewellery Shop.

Early life 
Sathyaraj was born as Rangaraj on 3 October 1954 to Subbiah, a doctor, and Nathambal, with two younger sisters, namely Kalpana Mandradiar and Roopa Senapathy. He is an ardent fan of M. G. Ramachandran and Hindi actor Rajesh Khanna. Sathyaraj completed his primary school education in St Mary's Convent school, Coimbatore and later studied for tenth standard from Suburban High School, Ramnagar, Coimbatore. He went to Government Arts College, Coimbatore, for a Bachelor of Science degree in botany.

Sathyaraj's dream was to become an actor, but his mother was against it and forbid him to join cinema. In 1976, in spite of his mother's opposition, he left Coimbatore to enter the Tamil film industry based in Kodambakkam, Chennai.

Sathyaraj entered the film industry after witnessing the shooting of the film Annakili, where he met actor Sivakumar and producer Thiruppur Manian and started pestering them to help him fulfill his cinematic ambitions. Sivakumar vehemently criticized his interest in acting and advised him to immediately return home. Nevertheless, he remained in Chennai. Producer Maathampatty Sivakumar supported him with sending money every month. He joined the drama troupe of Komal Swamynathan. Sathyaraj's first film in a credited role as an actor was Sattam En Kaiyil, in 1978, where he played a henchman to the main villain played by Thengai Srinivasan in the film. Later, he worked as production manager for the film Kannan Oru Kaikkuzhanthai.

In addition to his managerial role, he also had a small acting part in the film. His first film as the leading hero in Tamil was Saavi in 1985, which was a box office success. He acted in about 75 films from 1978 to 1985, most of which featured Sathyaraj in antagonist roles.

Career

1978–1985: Early career 
In his early career between 1978 and 1982, the antagonistic roles he played were often henchman to the main villain M. N. Nambiar and other villains and his role would be minor, while the main lead was Sivaji Ganesan, Jaishankar, Kamal Haasan, Rajinikanth and Vijayakanth. His college friend Manivannan directed Sathyaraj for the first time in the Tamil film January 1 in 1984, where Sathyaraj had a supporting role. Manivannan directed Sathyaraj in about 25 films from 1984 to 2013 and of them 18 had Sathyaraj as the main lead. His screen space as a villain increased after 24 Mani Neram (1984), directed by Manivannan, in which Sathyaraj's role was on par with that of lead actor Mohan. His acting skills in the film were noticed by many and he became famous among the Tamil film audience. Sathyaraj also felt that his villainous roles in  Nooravathu Naal and Anbin Mugavari, both again directed by Manivannan, had better footage than that of Vijayakanth's and Mohan's. In Needhiyin Nizhal (1985), which featured Prabhu in the lead role, Sathyaraj had a minuscule supporting role and played second fiddle to the main villain M. N. Nambiar. Sathyaraj started receiving offers to act as the hero in Tamil films from 1985.  Directors were reluctant to cast him as the protagonist as his second film as a lead actor Iravu Pookkal (1985) was not a success. Most of the films he was part of were of the action genre in this period.

1986–1989: Lead roles 
In the 1986 film Kadalora Kavithaigal, he played the lead romantic role and Behindwoods said: "Sathyaraj broke his image of an action hero and came up with a rollicking performance. He is the real star of the film." He received appreciation for playing his role in Mr. Bharath (1986), which revolved around the conflict between father, played by Sathyaraj and son (Rajinikanth). Sathyaraj acted as Rajinikanth's father in the film, though he was in fact 4 years younger than Rajinikanth. Manivannan, being friends with Sathyaraj, kept casting him in roles in his directorial ventures, regularly showcasing different emotions from Sathyaraj in films such as Muthal Vasantham, Palaivana Rojakkal and Vidinja Kalyanam.

After Kadalora Kavithaigal, Sathyaraj had box office hits as the lead hero between 1986 and 1988 such as Mandhira Punnagai, Kadamai Kanniyam Kattupaadu, Poovizhi Vasalile, Makkal En Pakkam (in which he had dual roles),  Annanagar Mudhal Theru, En Bommukutty Ammavukku and Chinnappadass. Manivanan from 1987 onward started casting Sathyaraj in positive roles and their combination had box office hits like Chinna Thambi Periya Thambi, Jallikattu, Ganam Courtar Avargale and Chinnappadas in this period. Sathyaraj received the Best Tamil Actor award in Filmfare Awards South for his performance in Vedham Pudhithu (1987).

Sathyaraj had established himself as a leading actor and in Chinna Thambi Periya Thambi, in which Prabhu and Sathyaraj were cast in the starring role, Prabhu's character played second fiddle to Sathyaraj's character. He played a bespectacled leading man in the commercially successful Ganam Courtaar Avargaley His 99th film was Dravidan and his 100th film was Vaathiyaar Veettu Pillai but the latter fared better at the box office.

1990–1999: Breakthrough
In the 90s, he attempted more films of comedy and action genres and occasionally did romantic films. He had few unsuccessful films such as Madurai Veeran Enga Saami, Magudam, Pangali and Kattalai in this period as he became selective of choosing his roles as main lead hero.   Many of them were commercially successful, such as Velai Kidaichuduchu, Nadigan, Pudhu Manithan, Rickshaw Mama, Walter Vetrivel, Airport, Thai Maaman Veera Padhakkam and Azhagarsamy. Sathyaraj played a dual role as father and son in the box office hit Amaithipadai, which is considered among his best performances. With regard to the film, he has stated: "I have no words for that film, as it took me to the next level as an actor". He also said that he almost did not sign up for the film as it was an antagonist character and he had moved away from antagonist roles and "gained some respectability" with films such as Poovizhi Vaasalile, Vedham Pudhidhu and Walter Vetrivel. After Thai Maaman became successful in 1994, the same team of Sathyaraj and director Guru Dhanapal decided to do their next venture Maaman Magal in 1995, which was also a moderate hit. He acted, produced and directed in his 125th film Villadhi Villain, which had him in three distinct roles and it was a successful project.

His pairing opposite actress Khushbu and Meena became popular in this decade. The box office hits of the pair Kushboo-Sathyaraj include Nadigan, Bramma, Rickshaw Mama, Kalyana Galatta, Suyamvaram and Malabar Police. The on-screen pair of Sathyaraj-Meena together had average grossers such as Thai Maaman, Maaman Magal and Vallal. His chemistry with actors Goundamani and Senthil has been well received and appreciated by the public and hence they have appeared in many movies together from Vaazhkai Chakkaram in 1990.

2000–2009: Comedy and Character roles 

The year 2000 proved to be unsuccessful for Sathyaraj. 4 films between 2000 and 2001 Veeranadai, Puratchikkaaran, Aandan Adimai and the comedy film Looty were failures while his commercially successful films were Sundar C.'s Unnai Kann Theduthey, P. Vasu's comedy film Asathal and Suraj's Kunguma Pottu Gounder. As many new young actors such as Ajith Kumar, Vijay and Prashanth who debuted in the 1990s had established themselves successfully by 2000, and others such as R. Madhavan, Jiiva and Srikanth made their mark in the mid-2000s and also since Sathyaraj had been using wigs since 1985 in films as he had begun losing hair since then, critics felt Sathyaraj's career as solo lead actor may end by 2000.

Sathyaraj re-invented himself as a romantic hero with the 2002 film Vivaramana Aalu, as a hero  Maaran and with his performance in the comedy film Aalukkoru Aasai in 2003. Sathyaraj and director Sakthi Chidambaram's combination gave 3 consecutive films, Ennamma Kannu, Maha Nadigan and Englishkaran. His 2004 film Sema Ragalai opposite Devayani was a hit at box office.

Few films like Ramachandra, Sena and Azhagesan received negative reviews in this decade. He co-starred with his son Sibiraj for the first time in Jore which was average. Bizhat described "It's interesting to watch the father – son combination together in Jore. Sathyaraj then acted with his son in 3 more films Mannin Maindhan (2005), Vetrivel Sakthivel (2006) and Kovai Brothers (2006), in which the two were seen as brothers and these were commercially successful. In 2007, he produced a Tamil film Lee, starring his son .

Other Films in the 2000s with Sathyaraj in the lead role that fared well at the box office were 6'2, Vanakkam Thalaiva, Kurukshetram, Adavadi, Periyar and Thangam. He received the Vijay Award for Best Actor for Onbadhu Roobai Nottu in 2007 and was also nominated for his performance in Periyar in the same year, in which he portrayed the life of social reformer and rationalist Periyar E. V. Ramasamy. About the role he said, "I myself being a rationalist, I found it easy to portray his character on screen. His principles and ideologies, like fighting for women's liberation and untouchability, have influenced me to a great extent". Sathyaraj makes a comeback to Tollywood after a long time in the action comedy movie Sankham (2009).

2010–2019: Supporting Actor 

In the early 2010's, he accepted supporting roles in films such as Aagathan, Guru Sishyan, Aayiram Vilakku, Uchithanai Muharnthaal, Nanban, Thalaivaa and Raja Rani. In Nanban, he played a college professor and won the Best Supporting Actor awards at the Filmfare, Vijay and SIIMA ceremonies, while in Thalaivaa, Raja Rani, Mirchi and Chennai Express he played father characters. Sathyaraj and Manivannan worked together for the last time in Nagaraja Cholan MA, MLA, which was Manivannan's 50th and last directorial venture before his death. A sequel to Amaidhipadai, it was also the 200th film of Sathyaraj and became a box office bomb.

He ventured into Telugu cinema after long time as a supporting actor in Sankham in 2009 and later did Mirchi in 2012, both of which were successful. He also entered Malayalam cinema with Aagathan in 2009. He played the role of Kattappa in Baahubali: The Beginning (2015) and has reprised the role in the sequel Baahubali: The Conclusion (2017).

In 2015, at the age of 60, the media and public at large rechristened him as Kattappa, as he received nationwide popularity for his role in India's biggest motion picture Baahubali: The Beginning. Since the time he made his debut as junior artiste at 24 years of age, he had been wanting to do a historical or a folklore film and it was his long cherished dream. He quoted in an interview in 2015: "I am a great fan of MGR who is popular in folklore films, like NTR in Telugu movies. My dream of doing a folklore at 24 has been realised at 60 through Rajamouli. I played Rajinikanth's father when I was 31 and Rajini was 35, so I never cared for age..it never mattered to me."

He acted as lead role in the film Oru Naal Iravil (2015). A faithful remake of much acclaimed Malayalam movie, Shutter has been helmed by editor turned director, Antony with great integrity. Sathyaraj as the middle aged man brings so much life to his character. In 2016, he acted with his son Sibiraj in Jackson Durai, another addition to the popular "Horror-comedy genre". Followed by the last movie series Baahubali 2: The Conclusion (2017). He played the role of DC Ratnavel "Randy", a Police officer in the film Mersal (2017) directed by Atlee. Sathyaraj won the Best Supporting Actor – Tamil for the movie Kanaa (2018). The following year, he subsequently starred in films like Jersey, Prati Roju Pandage and Thambi.

2021–present

In 2021, he appears in Tughlaq Durbar,  inspired by Manivannan's political satire Amaidhi Padai. Then Ponram's, MGR Magan which has Sathyaraj and Sasikumar starring. In Theerpugal Virkapadum, he plays the role of a dad who seeks revenge for the injustice meted out to his daughter. In 2022, he had nine releases with notably Etharkkum Thunindhavan, Veetla Vishesham and Love Today which received positive reviews. Following the Telugu Anthology drama series Meet Cute streaming on SonyLiv. In December, the horror thriller Connect was released where sathyaraj played the role of Nayanthara's father.

Personal life 
In 1979, Sathyaraj married Maheswari, niece of producer Madhampatti Sivakumar, and had two children, daughter Divya and son Sibiraj, also an actor. Sathyaraj is a staunch atheist.

Sathyaraj and Manivannan shared a close friendship since college and became frequent collaborators in films in Tamil cinema. The Hindu wrote: "His (Manivannan's) friendship with actor Sathiyaraj translated to several memorable moments on screen. Manivannan...along with Sathyaraj epitomised on screen what is colloquially known in Tamil as "nakkal" (snideness)". According to Behindwoods.com, Manivannan (as the director) and Sathyaraj had consecutive hit films together beginning from 1987 to 1994; Chinna Thambi Periya Thambi, Ganam Courtar Avargale, Jallikattu, Vaazhkai Chakkaram, Pudhu Manithan, Therku Theru Machan and Amaidhi Padai. About working with Manivannan, he has said that it "is a pleasure. There's no script, no dialogue sheet. It's all in his head. But, he extracts great performances". Sathyaraj and Manivannan also acted together in several films directed by other directors. About his personal relationship with Manivannan, Sathyaraj remarked "I still reminisce about the beautiful moments that I had with...Manivannan, a genius of a person. In fact, he is the one who taught me many things in life, and changed me, I became a good human from being just an actor. Every day, we used to have conversations over the phone on a wide range of topics. It was a 30-year relationship. No one could understand me the way he did". Manivannan died in 2013 and Sathyaraj has said that just 24 hours before his death they had discussed their next project and that he narrated him a story.

Filmography

Awards and nominations

Honours 

|-
! scope="row" | 1991
| Kalaimamani
| Government of Tamil Nadu
| 
|-
! scope="row" | 1995
| Tamil Nadu State Film Honorary Award (MGR Award)
| Tamil Nadu State Film Awards
| 
|-
! scope="row" | 2000
| Honorary Doctorate
| Sathyabama University
| 
|-
! scope="row" | 2011
| Kalaichchigaram Award
| Norway Tamil Film Festival Awards
| 
|-
! scope="row" | 2017
|Honorary Doctorate
| Vels University
|

Awards
{| class="wikitable"
|-  style="background:#b0c4de; text-align:center;"
! scope="col" | Year
! scope="col" | Category
! scope="col" | Award
! scope="col" | Film
! scope="col" | Result
|-
|1987
|Filmfare Award for Best Actor – Tamil
|Filmfare Awards South
|Vedham Pudhithu
|
|-
|1988
|Filmfare Award for Best Actor – Tamil
|Filmfare Awards South
|En Bommukutty Ammavukku
|
|-
|1990
|Filmfare Award for Best Actor – Tamil
|Filmfare Awards South
|Nadigan
|
|-
| 1990
|Tamil Nadu State Film Award Special Prize
|Tamil Nadu State Film Awards
| Nadigan
|
|-
| 1993
| Cinema Express Award for Best Actor – Tamil
|Cinema Express Awards
| Walter Vetrivel
| 
|-
| 2007
|Tamil Nadu State Film Award Special Prize
|Tamil Nadu State Film Awards
|Periyar
|
|-
| 2007
|Periyar Award
|Government of Tamil Nadu
|Periyar
|
|-
| 2007
|Best Actor
|Ananda Vikatan Cinema Awards
|Periyar
|
|-
| 2007
|Filmfare Award for Best Actor – Tamil
|Filmfare Awards South
|Onbadhu Roobai Nottu
|
|-
| 2007
|Vijay Award for Best Actor
|Vijay Awards
|Onbadhu Roobai Nottu
|
|-
|2012
|Vijay Award for Best Supporting Actor
|Vijay Awards
|Nanban
|
|-
|2012
|Filmfare Award for Best Supporting Actor – Tamil
|Filmfare Awards South
|Nanban
|
|-
|2012
|Best Actor in a Supporting Role
|South Indian International Movie Awards
|Nanban
|
|-
|2013
|Best Actor in a Supporting Role
|South Indian International Movie Awards
|Varuthapadatha Valibar Sangam
|
|-
|2013
|SIIMA Award for Best Supporting Actor – Telugu
|South Indian International Movie Awards
|Mirchi
|
|-
|2013
|Filmfare Award for Best Supporting Actor – Tamil
|Filmfare Awards South
|Raja Rani
|
|-
|2015
|Filmfare Award for Best Supporting Actor – Telugu
|Filmfare Awards South
|Baahubali: The Beginning
|
|-
|2015
|SIIMA Award for Best Supporting Actor (Telugu)
|South Indian International Movie Awards
|Baahubali: The Beginning
|
|-
|2015
|Best Actor in a Supporting Role – Telugu
|1st IIFA Utsavam
|Baahubali: The Beginning
|
|-
|2015
|Performance in a Supporting Role – Tamil
|1st IIFA Utsavam
|Baahubali: The Beginning
|
|-
|2015
|Best Supporting Actor
|Ananda Vikatan Cinema Awards
|Baahubali: The Beginning
|
|-
|2016
|Filmfare Award for Best Supporting Actor – Telugu
|Filmfare Awards South
|Nenu Sailaja
|
|-
|2017
|Filmfare Award for Best Supporting Actor – Telugu
|Filmfare Awards South
|Baahubali 2: The Conclusion
|
|-
|2017
|Best Supporting Actor – Telugu
|South Indian International Movie Awards
|Baahubali 2: The Conclusion
|
|-
|2017
|Best Supporting Actor
|Ananda Vikatan Cinema Awards
|Baahubali 2: The Conclusion
|
|-
|2018
|Filmfare Award for Best Supporting Actor – Tamil
|Filmfare Awards South
|Kanaa
|
|-
|2018
|Best Supporting Actor
|South Indian International Movie Awards
|Kanaa
|
|-
|2019
|Best Supporting Actor
|South Indian International Movie Awards
|Thambi
|
|-

References

External links 

 

1954 births
20th-century Indian male actors
21st-century Indian male actors
Filmfare Awards South winners
Indian atheists
Indian male film actors
Living people
Male actors from Tamil Nadu
Male actors in Hindi cinema
Male actors in Kannada cinema
Male actors in Tamil cinema
Male actors in Telugu cinema
People from Coimbatore district
People from Coimbatore
Periyarists
Tamil male actors
Tamil Nadu State Film Awards winners